Ptghavan is a village in the Noyemberyan Municipality of the Tavush Province of Armenia, near the Armenia–Georgia border.

References 

Populated places in Tavush Province